Pleiku Airport  is a regional airport located near the city of Pleiku within Gia Lai Province in southern Vietnam.

Airlines and destinations

Statistics

History
Pleiku Airport was little more than an undeveloped air strip in December 1962 when it was designated by the Republic of Vietnam Air Force (VNAF) as Air Base 62. It was expanded during the Vietnam War and became a major air base for the VNAF and United States Air Force activities, but never reached the saturation and population proportions of the major air bases of the coastal lowlands. After 1975, it was developed into a civil airport.

See also

 List of airports in Vietnam

References

External links
 Trip To Pleiku - 2006

Pleiku
Buildings and structures in Gia Lai province
Airports in Vietnam